Fred Creighton (June 24, 1930 in Port Arthur, Ontario – September 28, 2011) was a Canadian ice hockey centre and coach.  Creighton is best known for his time as an NHL head coach.

Creighton grew up in rural Manitoba. After completing his journeyman hockey career, he played in a variety of minor leagues between 1951 and 1964. He served as an assistant and later the head coach of the Charlotte Checkers of the Eastern Hockey League. He led the team from behind the bench for eight years, guiding the club to two Walker Cup Titles in 1970–71 and 1971–72. Creighton then coached the Atlanta Flames from 1975 to 1979, making the playoffs in his final four seasons as coach but losing in the first round of each year's postseason. Creighton was hired as coach of the Boston Bruins in 1979, but failed to mesh with powerful GM and former coach Harry Sinden, who fired Creighton with 15 days left in the regular season. In 1981, Creighton was then hired to coach the Indianapolis Checkers, the top Central Hockey League affiliate of the New York Islanders, where he led the team to Adams Cup championships in 1982 and 1983 and a spot in the CHL Finals in 1984. He became the Checkers' general manager when the team moved to the International Hockey League in 1984–85, and served as interim coach in the playoffs. In 1985, he again became the head coach of the Islanders' top affiliate, the AHL's Springfield Indians, full-time in 1985–86, and as a midseason replacement the following two years.

After retirement, Creighton became a franchisee for Little Caesars pizza. He died in 2011 due to complications from Alzheimer's disease.

NHL coaching stats

References

External links
 

1930 births
2011 deaths
Atlanta Flames coaches
Boston Bruins coaches
Canadian ice hockey centres
Canadian ice hockey coaches
Canadian ice hockey defencemen
Charlotte Checkers (EHL) players
Deaths from Alzheimer's disease
Eastern Hockey League coaches
Flin Flon Bombers players
Fort Wayne Komets players
Ice hockey people from Ontario
New Haven Blades players
New Westminster Royals (WHL) players
Portland Buckaroos players
Providence Reds players
Saskatoon Quakers players
Seattle Americans players
Spokane Comets players
Sportspeople from Thunder Bay
Neurological disease deaths in North Carolina